Angourie Rice (born 1 January 2001) is an Australian actress. She began her career as a child actress, coming to attention for her roles in These Final Hours and The Nice Guys. She is known for her portrayal of Betty Brant in the Marvel Cinematic Universe, appearing in Spider-Man: Homecoming (2017), Spider-Man: Far From Home (2019), and Spider-Man: No Way Home (2021).

Early life
Rice was named after a town in New South Wales where her grandmother lived. She was born in Sydney and lives in Melbourne, with her parents Jeremy Rice, a director, and Kate Rice, a writer, where she attended Princes Hill Secondary College graduating in 2018. She also lived in Perth for five years and in Munich, Germany, for one year before moving back to Melbourne.

Career 
Rice began her career in Perth, Western Australia with several short films and Australian television credits. In 2012, Rice gained industry attention at just eleven years old with her lead role in Zak Hilditch’s short Transmission, for which she won the Best Actress award at the St. Kilda Film Festival.

In 2013, Rice made her feature film acting debut with apocalyptic thriller film These Final Hours. She also appeared in the live action sequences at the beginning and end of the animated film Walking with Dinosaurs. In 2014, Rice appeared in the television series The Doctor Blake Mysteries, Worst Year of My Life Again, and appeared in Mako: Island of Secrets in 2015.

In 2016, Rice had her break-out performance as Holly March in the action comedy The Nice Guys opposite Ryan Gosling and Russell Crowe. She also appeared in the science-fiction fantasy film Nowhere Boys: The Book of Shadows as Tegan, a supernatural villain. In 2017, she played Eliza Wishart in the Australian film adaptation of the novel Jasper Jones which garnered several AACTA nominations. She also played Jane in The Beguiled.

Rice played Betty Brant in the 2017 film Spider-Man: Homecoming. She reprised the part, this time in a more significant role, in the 2019 sequel Spider-Man: Far From Home. She reprised the role again in the web series The Daily Bugle, and yet again in Spider-Man: No Way Home.

In 2018, Rice headlined the romantic drama Every Day, and as Lisa in the Australian film adaptation of Ladies in Black for which she won an AACTA award for Best Lead Actress. In 2019, Rice starred opposite Miley Cyrus in the Season 5 finale of Black Mirror, an episode described as a "save-the-day buddy romp" and "a teen sci-fi adventure". In 2021, Rice was listed in Variety magazine's coveted 'Actors to Watch' list, as well as their 'Power of Young Hollywood' list. She played the role of Siobhan in Mare of Easttown opposite Kate Winslet. She noted that the Delco accent was hard to master and worked hard to tone down her Australian accent. In April 2022, Rice was cast to star alongside Jennifer Garner in the Apple TV+ miniseries The Last Thing He Told Me. In December 2022, Rice was cast as Cady Heron in the film-adaptation of the Broadway musical Mean Girls, based on the 2004 hit film alongside Auli’i Cravalho, Renée Rapp, and Jaquel Spivey, to be released on Paramount+ .

Podcast 
Inspired from her current book club activities, she runs the podcast The Community Library with an aim to democratise critical reading skills. The podcast started its first episode in 2019.

Filmography

Film

Television

References

External links

 
 

2001 births
Living people
Australian child actresses
Australian film actresses
Australian television actresses
21st-century Australian actresses
Actresses from Melbourne
Best Actress AACTA Award winners
Place of birth missing (living people)